Brian Dwight Taylor (born June 9, 1951) is an American former professional basketball player who played for the New York Nets of the American Basketball Association (ABA) and the Kansas City Kings, Denver Nuggets, and San Diego Clippers of the National Basketball Association (NBA).

Basketball career 
A 6'2" guard from Princeton University, he was selected by the Seattle SuperSonics in the second round of the 1972 NBA draft.  However, he began his professional career with the New York Nets of the ABA, for whom he played four seasons, appearing in two ABA All-Star Games.  When the Nets joined the NBA in 1976, they traded Taylor to the Kansas City Kings along with Jim Eakins and 2 first round draft picks in exchange for Hall of Famer Tiny Archibald. He averaged a career-high 17 points per game in 1976–77.  He also played for the Denver Nuggets and San Diego Clippers, before a torn achilles tendon forced his retirement in 1982.

Taylor graduated from Perth Amboy High School in 1969.

During the 1979–80 NBA season, Taylor led the league in 3-point field goals made with a total of 90.

Business career 
In 2012, Great Hearts Academies hired Taylor to be the Executive Director of Teleos Preparatory Academy in Phoenix, Arizona.

Family 
His son, Bryce, played guard for the Oregon Ducks.

References

External links
Career Stats

1951 births
Living people
African-American basketball players
All-American college men's basketball players
American men's basketball players
Basketball players at the 1971 Pan American Games
Basketball players from New Jersey
Denver Nuggets players
Kansas City Kings players
New York Nets players
Point guards
Perth Amboy High School alumni
Princeton Tigers men's basketball players
San Diego Clippers players
Seattle SuperSonics draft picks
Sportspeople from Perth Amboy, New Jersey
Pan American Games competitors for the United States
21st-century African-American people
20th-century African-American sportspeople